The Archdiocese of Milan is a Latin Church ecclesiastical territory or archdiocese of the Catholic Church in Italy which covers the areas of Milan, Monza, Lecco and Varese. It has long maintained its own Latin liturgical rite usage, the Ambrosian rite, which is still used in the greater part of the diocesan territory. Among its past archbishops, the better known are Ambrose, Charles Borromeo, Pope Pius XI and Pope Paul VI.

The Archdiocese of Milan is the metropolitan see of the ecclesiastical province of Milan, which includes the suffragan dioceses of Bergamo, Brescia, Como, Crema, Cremona, Lodi, Mantova, Pavia, and Vigevano.

Milan's Archdiocese is the largest in Europe, and the one having the most priests in the world, with 2,648 priests living in the diocese, among which 1,861 are secular priests.

History

According to the legend, the Gospel was brought to Milan by the apostle Barnabas, and the first Bishop of Milan, Anathalon, was a disciple of that apostle. But a diocese cannot have been established there, as such, before 200, as the dioceses of the church evolved from the civil (Roman) dioceses following the reforms of Emperor Diocletian, for the list of the bishops of Milan names only five predecessors of Mirocles, who participated at the Lateran council held in 313 in Rome. During the persecutions of the third and early fourth century, several Christians suffered martyrdom and were venerated at Milan: among them Gervasius and Protasius (first persecution of Diocletian), Victor, Nabor and Felix, and Nazarius and Celsus. The persecutions ended in 313 when the Emperors Constantine I and Licinius issued the Edict of Milan which proclaimed the religious toleration in the Roman Empire.

Historically, the Milanese church has been in full communion with the Papacy. Among its bishops should be named Eustorgius I and Dionysius, who firmly opposed apostasy imposed by the Roman Emperor Constantius II. Dionysus was exiled to Cappadocia (355), while the Romans put Auxentius on the episcopal throne of Milan. At the death of Auxentius, Ambrose was elected bishop by the people of Milan (374-97). Among his successors, Simplicianus, Senator and Dacius (530-52), who lived almost always in exile at Constantinople on account of the Gothic War.

During the Lombard invasion, many things happened to the church in Milan. The Schism of the Three Chapters guaranteed autonomy of the Milanese Church for 38 years, since the Lombards were enemies of the Byzantines. At the siege of Milan by the Lombard Alboin, the Bishop Honoratus (568) sought refuge in Genoa, with a great number of his clergy, which returned to Milan only 70 years later under John the Good.

In the 10th-century, the archbishops of Milan became feudatory of the Emperor extending his jurisdiction to all North-West Italy. The most distinguished of these was Ariberto da Intimiano (1018–45). As the power of the burghers grew, that of the archbishops waned, and with it the imperial authority which the prelate represented, and since the 12th century Milan became a Guelph town who fought the Emperor. The archbishop Ottone Visconti in the 13th-century caused himself to be proclaimed perpetual lord, thus putting an end to the Republic of Milan and establishing the power of the House of Visconti who ruled the Duchy of Milan from 1277 to 1447.

The figure who marked the modern history of the church of Milan was Charles Borromeo, archbishop of Milan from 1564 to 1584, who was a leading figure during the Counter-Reformation and was responsible for significant reforms in the Catholic Church. His pastoral efforts were followed also by his successors, such as Federico Borromeo (died 1631) and Giuseppe Pozzobonelli (died 1783).

In the 20th century, two Cardinal Archbishops of Milan were elected to the papacy: in 1922, Cardinal Achille Ratti was elected as Pope Pius XI, and in 1963 Cardinal Giovanni Battista Montini was elected as Pope Paul VI. The church of Milan was governed from 1979 to 2002 by Cardinal Carlo Maria Martini, who had been a favorite of the Catholic left.

Present leadership
As of 7 July 2017, the current Metropolitan Archbishop of Milan is Archbishop Mario Enrico Delpini, who has been serving since his appointment by Pope Francis, having served previously as the Vicar-General and the Auxiliary Bishop of Milan. Delpini had succeeded the retiring Cardinal Angelo Scola, who had been in office since 2011 and had been a possible papabile.

Archbishop Delpini is assisted by four Auxiliary Bishops: Erminio De Scalzi, Luigi Stucchi, Franco Agnesi, and Paolo Martinelli.  The resignations of Stucchi and De Scalzi were accepted by Pope Francis on 30 April 2020.  That same day, he appointed Giovanni Raimondi and Giuseppe Vegezzi as auxiliary bishops.

Seminaries 
The Seminary of the archdiocese has the principal see in Venegono Inferiore.
The minor seminary were located in Seveso.

Bishops and archbishops
A list of the bishops and archbishops of Milan is engraved in plaque in the South nave of the Cathedral of Milan, but such list contains some historical errors. The data here below follow the work of Eugenio Cazzani.

Ancient age

Genoa period
 Honoratus (560–571?)
 Frontone (571–573?)
 Lawrence II (573–592)
 Constantius (593–600)
 Deodatus (601–628)
 Asterius (629–639)
 Forte (639–641)

Middle Age

Modern Age

Parishes
The 1,104 parishes all fall within the region of Lombardy. They are divided between the Province of Bergamo, the Province of Como, the Province of Lecco, the Province of Milan, the Province of Pavia, and the Province of Varese.

See also 
 Ambrosian chant
 Ambrosian Rite
 Cathedral of Milan
 Angelo Scola
 Early Christian churches in Milan

Notes

References 
 Catholic Hierarchy Profile of the Archdiocese of Milan
 
 List of archbishops, part one
 List of archbishops, part two
 News from the Archdiocese of Milan

Apostolic sees
Milan
 
Christianity in Milan
Metropolitan City of Milan
Province of Bergamo
Province of Como
Province of Lecco
Province of Pavia
Province of Varese
Pope Paul VI
Pope Pius XI
Milan
1st-century establishments in Italy